Pooja Surve is an Indian individual rhythmic gymnast. She represents India at international competitions. She competed at world championships, including at the 2009 World Rhythmic Gymnastics Championships, Japan. In 2010, she was the only gymnast from India to be in the top 16 at the 2010 Commonwealth Games; she won Miss Exotic Performance award in World Cup Belarus 2010, becoming the first Indian to ever get this award; and she also participated in the 2010 World Rhythmic Gymnastics Championships, held in Moscow. 

She has earned more than 150 gold, silver and bronze medals to date. She is one of the highest medal-holding gymnasts in India. She is the recipient of the prestigious Shree Shiv Chhatrapati Awardee of Govt. of Maharashtra in the discipline of Rhythmic Gymnastics in the year 2010.

In the year 2016 she was selected as the technical head by Star-sports for Rio Olympics and did the commentary for all artistic, rhythmic and trampoline gymnastics. 

She has also received the Indian Sports Award from the Govt. of India in the year 2019 in the field of sports. She is the recipient of Hindustan Times – Thane Ratna Award 2019. In the year 2020, she was designated as Program Director of Sports Authority of India's Online Education Program for Rhythmic Gymnastics grass-root level 

Besides being a gymnast, Surve is a classical Kathak and Ballet dancer. 

She has also been on the reality shows on Zee Marathi, Colors, Zee TV channel.

After her career she became gymnastics coach. Currently she is the Director of The Phoenix Gymnastics Academy based in Thane. She is also Federation International Gymnastics international judge in both rhythmic gymnastics individual and rhythmic gymnastics group, having judged many International competitions.

Early years

Early life 
Pooja went to Saraswati Mandir High School, Mahim and was ranked 1st in her class. Later, her junior and degree college was D.G. Ruparel college of Arts, Science and Commerce, where she was a top student.

She was selected for the Artistic gymnastics squad. At the age of 6 years in 1996, she started with her competitive career in Artistic gymnastics where she won her 1st competition medal a gold in balancing beam and a bronze in the all around. The state championship was held at Hanuman Vyayam Prasarak Mandal, Amravati.

Later her mother also enrolled her to classical dance classes where she learnt Kathak under the guidance of Shrimati Radhika Phanse, and today she is upantya visharad in the same.

School life 
Pooja was a brilliant student in the school, who always stood 1st. She won the best student of the school award as well.

She won every school competition from elocution, essay writing , poetry recitation, dance, maths competitive exams etc.

Later in her college also she won the best student of the college award.

Rise to prominence 
After 2006, she switched her career from artistic gymnastics to rhythmic gymnastics.

Professional athletics career

Rhythmic gymnastics

2007 Injury 
An injury to Pooja in February 2007 while playing the National Games, Assam caused her to miss nine months of training. Having recovered, she always had an urge to compete internationally. But she was asked to quit the sport by many. Having a strong will power and determined Pooja did not let the sport go away from her, she came back with a high spirits at the Rhythmic Gymnastics World Championships, Japan, Mie, her first international competition where she stood 1st amongst the Indian Squad of Rhythmic gymnastics.

Later she received the Miss Exotic Performance Award at the Belarus World Cup (1st ever award won by an Indian Rhythmic Gymnast). She also represented at the Rhythmic Gymnastics World Championships 2010, Moscow .

2009 World Championships, Japan 
For the First Time in History, Indian Women qualify for the World Rhythmic Gymnastics Championships.

2010 Commonwealth Games, India 
Pooja Surve created history, she represented India at the Common Wealth Games 2010. She is the only gymnast from India who qualified for All-Around Individual Finals competition and received 16th Rank. She created this record in 2010 and till date her record is not broken.

She is the top ranked best rhythmic gymnast in India till date.

Profession

2011 
Pooja established The Phoenix Gymnastics Academy at Thane, in 2011 wherein about 250 gymnasts are getting trained.

2012 
Pooja completed her International Coaching Course.

2014 
Pooja has been the competition director for many state and national competitions. In 2014 she hosted the Senior, Junior , Sub-junior, U/8 and U/10 national competition in her gymnastics academy where about 300 gymnasts all over the country had participated. Highly decorated TMC dignitaries, various Bollywood Actors and sports personalities visited as guests for this competition. She also appeared for the International Coaching Course examination where she ranked 3rd worldwide.

2015 
She was officiated at the National Games.

2016 
Pooja was selected as the Technical Head of Gymnastics by Star Sports for the Rio Olympics where she did the commentary for the entire Rio Olympics Artistic gymnastics, Rhythmic gymnastics and Trampoline Gymnastics.

2017 
Pooja along with her sister Mansi appeared for the International Judging Examination and she again made a record for the country. She received the highest marks of category 1 in both Rhythmic Gymnastics Individual and Rhythmic Gymnastics Group in the country. Pooja and Mansi are now known as Surve Sisters and their pair is extremely lovable.

2018 
Pooja was selected as the judge representing India at the Junior Asian Championships and out of the 4 selected 3 gymnasts were trained under the Surve Sisters.

2019 
Pooja Surve is the only coach from the state of Maharashtra to be the Coach of Khelo India Academy Camp for Rhythmic gymnastics which was held in Delhi. Pooja was selected as the judge representing India at the junior and senior Asian Championships whereas Mansi was the India team coach. They created record, 3 out of 4 gymnasts selected for the Asian Championships. For the first time junior Gymnast Sanyukta Kale scored highest marks of 15.100 ranking 7th in the qualifying CLUBS apparatus.

2020

As an international judge

Achievements

International competitions

District and divisional competitions 
Pooja also participated in Multiple sports competitions like Yogasa, Suryanamaskar, Athletics, Rope Mallakhamb, etc. in Inter-Club, District and Divisional Levels.

In the competition – Annual Sports Meet, Shree Samartha Vyayam Mandir , Pooja has won over 15 medals and they are as follows:

Personal life 
Pooja Surve was born in the financial capital of India, Mumbai on 8 June 1990 to parents Shriniwas and Smita Surve. She has younger sister Mansi Surve.

Recognition

Special awards 

 Awarded the prestigious " Shree Shiv Chhatrapati Award " (Maharashtra State highest sports award) for achieving excellence in the discipline of Rhythmic gymnastics.
 Awarded the INDIAN SPORTS AWARD by GOVT. OF INDIA in the field of RHYTHMIC GYMNASTICS.
 Awarded "Jilha Kreeda Puraskar" by Kreeda and Yuvak Sanchalanalay, Maharashtra State
 Awarded by " Akhil Bhartiya Bhandari Mahasangh " for great achievements in gymnastics.
 Awarded " Priyadarshini Kartutwa Gaurav Puraskar 2010 " in the fields of Kala Kreeda by Priya Darshini foundation.
 Felicitated by chief minister of Maharashtra Shree Prithviraj Chauhan for winning gold medal for Maharashtra state in the National games held at Ranchi, Jharkhand

Extra-Curricular 

 Kathak Dancer: passed Visharad Pratham examination from Akhil Bhartiya Gandharva Vidyalaya .
 Ballet Dancer: Expert in the ballet dance.
 Gold Medalist of " Bala Shree Award " (President award) –  western zone of India in creative performance held at National Bal Bhavan, Delhi.
 Winner of College Idol competition organized by National Institute.
 Winner of "Taalawar Taal de Dhamal" dance reality show on Mi Marathi channel
 Best ramp walk winner in beauty pageant " Shravan Queen”
 Awarded best student of D.G. Ruparel college and won the Golden trophy for consecutively 3 years for excellence in the field of academics sports and extra-curricular activities.

References

External links

Videos 
 Pooja Surve in 2010 Commonwealth Games Ribbon All Around on YouTube
 Pooja Surve in 2010 Commonwealth Games Ball Team Final on YouTube
 Pooja Surve's Students selected to Perform at International Level via Zee 24 Taas on YouTube
 Students of International player of Gymnastic Pooja Surve perform at Kala Krida Mahotsav 2016 on YouTube
 Pooja Surve in 2010 Commonwealth Games Ball Team Final on YouTube

1990 births
Living people
Sportspeople from Mumbai
Indian rhythmic gymnasts
Place of birth missing (living people)
Gymnasts at the 2010 Commonwealth Games
Commonwealth Games competitors for India
Gymnastics coaches
Indian sports coaches